Agonum consimile is a species of ground beetle in the Platyninae subfamily. It was described by Leonard Gyllenhaal in 1810. It inhabits countries like Finland, Latvia, Moldavia, Norway, Russia, Sweden, and the United States.

References

Beetles described in 1810
Beetles of Europe
Beetles of North America
consimile